Mary Mazur is a producer. After graduating from Santa Clara University she began her career working in television movies, primetime programming and drama development at NBC. She has been the Development Executive for the Emmy Award-Winning Miniseries A Year In the Life as well as the executive producer for Copenhagen and The Old Settler. She has also been the executive producer for documentaries such as World War Two: Behind Closed Doors and How Art Made the World.

Filmography
 World War Two: Behind Closed Doors - 2008
 How Art Made the World - 2005
 A Place of Our Own - 2005
 Copshop - 2004
 Copenhagen - 2002
 Collected Stories - 2002
 The Old Settler - 2001

References

External links
 

Living people
Santa Clara University alumni
Year of birth missing (living people)
American producers
American documentary film producers